Stalybridge and Hyde is a constituency represented in the House of Commons of the UK Parliament since 2010 by Jonathan Reynolds, a member of Labour Co-op.

Constituency profile 
The constituency lies on the lower slopes of the Pennines and beginning of the plain below, on the cusp of Greater Manchester and has three broad settlements, the largest of which are Hyde which is bordered by the River Tame and Peak Forest Canal, and Stalybridge which similarly has several parks and recreation grounds and leads up the Tame Valley to Mossley.  The geographic features include the footpaths from both towns on neighbouring promontories, Harridge and Wild Bank.  Stamford Golf Club and Werneth Low Country Park are in the seat.

The area has been susceptible to a major downturn in all but the most affluent and productive areas and workless claimants, registered jobseekers,  were in November 2012 higher than the national average of 3.8%, and regional average of 4.4%, at 5.0% of the population based on a statistical compilation by The Guardian.

Creation 
The seat was created under the Representation of the People Act 1918 as a county division of Cheshire. It was formed by combining the bulk of the abolished parliamentary borough of Stalybridge and the majority of the abolished county seat of Hyde.

Boundaries 

1918–1950: The Boroughs of Dukinfield, Hyde, and Stalybridge, the Urban Districts of Hollingworth and Mottram in Longdendale, and the Rural District of Tintwistle.

1950–1983: The Boroughs of Dukinfield, Hyde, and Stalybridge, the Urban District of Longdendale, and the Rural District of Tintwistle.

Only minor boundary changes; the urban district of Longdendale had been formed in 1936 by combining Hollingworth and Mottram in Longdendale.

On 1 April 1974, under the Local Government Act 1972, the bulk of the area covered by the constituency was incorporated into the newly created Borough of Tameside within Greater Manchester; the sparsely-populated rural district of Tintwistle was transferred to Derbyshire. However, the constituency boundaries remained unchanged until the Third Periodic Review of Westminster constituencies came into effect for the 1983 general election.

1983–1997: The Borough of Tameside wards of Dukinfield, Dukinfield Stalybridge, Hyde Godley, Hyde Newton, Hyde Werneth, Longdendale, Stalybridge North, and Stalybridge South.

Apart from the area now in Derbyshire, which was transferred to the constituency of High Peak, the boundaries remained broadly unchanged.

1997–present: The Borough of Tameside wards of Dukinfield / Stalybridge, Hyde Godley, Hyde Newton, Hyde Werneth, Longdendale, Mossley, Stalybridge North, and Stalybridge South.

Dukinfield ward transferred to Denton and Reddish; gained Mossley ward from Ashton-under-Lyne.

Political History 
The seat was held by Conservatives for 34 of the 37 years from 1918 to 1945, and for the other three years by the other two main parties, the Liberal Party (1922-1923) and the Labour Party (1929-1931). It was regained by Labour at the 1945 general election and has remained a safe seat for them since then.

In 1945 the seat was won by Rev. Gordon Lang who was honorary secretary of the United Europe Movement and a leading member of the Proportional Representation Society but who retired on ill health in 1951.

James Purnell, a former 10 Downing Street special advisor, who was first elected at the 2001 general election resigned his cabinet position as Work and Pensions Secretary on 4 June 2009, citing concerns over Prime Minister Gordon Brown's leadership. On 19 February 2010, he announced that he would not contest the 2010 election. Senior Labour Party officials were concerned that Unite was strategically attempting to have Peter Wheeler, a senior Unite official, selected as the Labour candidate, as one of a series of seats, leading to the National Executive Committee putting forward Jonathan Reynolds on the selection shortlist who, as widely expected, won the election.

Members of Parliament

Elections

Elections in the 2010s

Elections in the 2000s

Elections in the 1990s

Elections in the 1980s

Elections in the 1970s

Elections in the 1960s

Elections in the 1950s

Elections in the 1940s 

General Election 1939–40:
Another general election was required to take place before the end of 1940. The political parties had been making preparations for an election to take place from 1939 and by the end of this year, the following candidates had been selected; 
Conservative: Horace Trevor-Cox
Labour: Gordon Lang

Elections in the 1930s

Elections in the 1920s

Elections in the 1910s

See also 
 List of parliamentary constituencies in Greater Manchester
History of parliamentary constituencies and boundaries in Cheshire

Notes

References
Specific

General
Craig, F. W. S. (1983). British parliamentary election results 1918–1949 (3 ed.). Chichester: Parliamentary Research Services. .

Parliamentary constituencies in Greater Manchester
Constituencies of the Parliament of the United Kingdom established in 1918
Politics of Tameside
Stalybridge